Millarville is a hamlet in Alberta, Canada within the Foothills County.

The hamlet is within Census Division No. 6 and in the federal riding of Macleod.

History 
The post office first opened in April 1892.

Demographics 
The population of Millarville according to the most recent 2003 municipal census conducted by Foothills County is 58.

Attractions 

Millarville shares its name with the Millarville Market and Fair.  Founded in 1907, the market and fair are hosted by the Millarville Racing and Agricultural Society on land northeast of the hamlet, 1.6 kilometres east down Highway 549, east. (MRAS).

The Leighton Art Centre includes a gallery of Alberta art and the museum home of founders and artists A.C. and Barbara Leighton. There is also a gallery shop of art and handcrafts.

Education 
Millarville Community School is located in the hamlet. The school includes a kindergarten program through to grade eight.

See also 
List of communities in Alberta
List of hamlets in Alberta

References 

Foothills County
Hamlets in Alberta